Fernanda Guitron (born ) is a Mexican female volleyball player. She is part of the Mexico women's national volleyball team.

She participated in the 2014 FIVB Volleyball World Grand Prix.
On club level she played for JALISCO in 2014.

References

External links
 Profile at FIVB.org

1996 births
Living people
Mexican women's volleyball players
Place of birth missing (living people)